Wat Chalo is one of the nine subdistricts (tambon) of Bang Kruai District, in Nonthaburi Province, Thailand. The subdistrict is bounded by (clockwise from north) Bang Si Thong, Bang Kruai, Bang Phlat, Taling Chan, Maha Sawat and Bang Khanun subdistricts. In 2020 it had a total population of 16,691 people.

Administration

Central administration
The subdistrict is subdivided into 10 villages (muban).

Local administration
The whole area of the subdistrict is covered by Bang Kruai Town Municipality.

References

External links
Website of Bang Kruai Town Municipality

Tambon of Nonthaburi province
Populated places in Nonthaburi province